Marian Abdi Hussein (born 24 July 1986) is a Somalia-born Norwegian politician from the Socialist Left Party. She has served as an MP for Oslo since 2021, having previously been a deputy MP for the same constituency from 2017 to 2021. She has also served as one of the party's deputy leaders since 2023.

Political career

Parliament 
Hussein was deputy representative to the Storting for the period 2017–2021. She was elected representative to the Storting from the constituency of Oslo for the period 2021–2025, for the Socialist Left Party.

In the Storting, she is a member of the Standing Committee on Health and Care Services for the period 2021–2025, and a member of the delegation to the Parliamentary Assembly of the Organization for Security and Co-operation in Europe.

Party politics 
In February 2023, ahead of the party convention, the Socialist Party committee was divided on whether or not to designate Hussein or Lars Haltbrekken to become deputy leader succeeding Kirsti Bergstø who was the sole candidate to succeed outgoing leader Audun Lysbakken. Hussein was elected deputy leader on 18 March at the party convention, with 114 votes against her rival Lars Haltbrekken's 101.

Personal life
Hussein was born in Somalia on 24 July 1986, and moved to Norway when she was ten years old. She has worked as a social worker for both the NAV and the Child Welfare Service.

References

1986 births
Refugees in Norway
Living people
Socialist Left Party (Norway) politicians
Members of the Storting
21st-century Norwegian politicians